This is a list of hospitals for each country in Asia:

Sovereign states
The following is a list of lists of hospitals in countries in Asia.   A link to the category for hospitals in a country and number of hospital articles and sub-categories are shown, also.
List of hospitals in Afghanistan
List of hospitals in Armenia
List of hospitals in Azerbaijan
List of hospitals in Bahrain
List of hospitals in Bangladesh
List of hospitals in Bhutan
List of hospitals in Brunei
List of hospitals in China
List of hospitals in Cambodia
List of hospitals in Cyprus
List of hospitals in East Timor
List of hospitals in Egypt
List of hospitals in Georgia (country)
List of hospitals in India
List of hospitals in Indonesia
List of hospitals in Iran
List of hospitals in Iraq
List of hospitals in Israel
List of hospitals in Japan
List of hospitals in Jordan
List of hospitals in Kazakhstan
List of hospitals in Kuwait
List of hospitals in Kyrgyzstan
List of hospitals in Laos
List of hospitals in Lebanon
List of hospitals in Macau
List of hospitals in Malaysia
List of hospitals in Maldives
List of hospitals in Mongolia
List of hospitals in Myanmar
List of hospitals in Nepal
List of hospitals in North Korea
List of hospitals in Pakistan
List of hospitals in the Philippines
List of hospitals in Oman
List of hospitals in Qatar
List of hospitals in Russia
List of hospitals in Saudi Arabia
List of hospitals in Singapore
List of hospitals in South Korea
List of hospitals in Sri Lanka
List of hospitals in Syria
List of hospitals in Tajikistan
List of hospitals in Thailand
List of hospitals in Turkey
List of hospitals in Turkmenistan
List of hospitals in the United Arab Emirates
List of hospitals in Uzbekistan
List of hospitals in Vietnam
List of hospitals in Yemen

States with limited recognition
 Abkhazia, List of hospitals in Abkhazia
 Republic of Artsakh, List of hospitals in Republuc of Artsakh
 Northern Cyprus, List of hospitals in Northern Cyprus
 State of Palestine, List of hospitals in the State of Palestine
 South Ossetia, List of hospitals in South Ossetia
 Taiwan, List of hospitals in Taiwan

Dependencies and other territories
 British Indian Ocean Territory, The population is only British and American military. There are no hospitals. The U.S. Navy runs a Branch Health Clinic on Diego Garcia. 
 List of Hospitals in Christmas Island  (Christmas Island has one hospital: Christmas Island Hospital. See Lists of hospitals in Oceania#Christmas Island.
 List of hospitals in Cocos (Keeling) Islands.  It has no hospitals. See Healthcare in Cocos (Keeling) Islands for more details.
 List of hospitals in Hong Kong
 List of hospitals in Macau

See also
Lists of hospitals in Africa
Lists of hospitals in Europe
Lists of hospitals in North America
Lists of hospitals in Oceania
Lists of hospitals in South America

References

 
Asia-related lists
 List of hospitals in Asia